Adam David McGinty (born 24 March 1971) is a former Australian cricketer who played for Victoria and Tasmania.

External links
 

1971 births
Living people
Victoria cricketers
Tasmania cricketers
Australian cricketers
Cricketers from Melbourne